Richard Anderson is an American politician currently in the Oregon State Senate from Oregon's 5th district. He was elected to the seat after the incumbent Democrat decided not to run for reelection. He defeated Democratic candidate Melissa Cribbins in the general election, winning 49.4% to 46.5%, with 4.2% of the vote going to other candidates.

References

Living people
Republican Party Oregon state senators
21st-century American politicians
Year of birth missing (living people)